Jean Chardin (16 November 1643 – 5 January 1713), born Jean-Baptiste Chardin, and also known as Sir John Chardin, was a French jeweller and traveller whose ten-volume book The Travels of Sir John Chardin is regarded as one of the finest works of early Western scholarship on Safavid Iran and the Near East in general.

Life and work
He was born in Paris, son of a wealthy merchant, jeweller of the Place Dauphine, and followed his father's business. 
In 1664, he started for the East Indies with M. Raisin, a Lyons merchant. 
They journeyed by Constantinople and the Black Sea, reaching Persia early in 1666. 
The same year the shah, Abbas II, made Chardin his agent for the purchase of jewels. 
In the middle of 1667, he visited India and returned to Persia in 1669. The next year he arrived in Paris. 
He issued an account of some events to which he was an eyewitness in Persia, entitled 'Le Couronnement de Soleiman Troisième,' Paris, 1671. 
A learned nobleman, Mirza Sefi, a prisoner in his own palace at Isfahan, had entertained him, instructed him in the Persian language, and assisted him in this work. 
Peter de la Croix and Tavernier severely criticised it, while Ange de la Brosse as strongly defended it.

Chardin again started for the East, August 1671. 
He was at Constantinople from March to July 1672. 
A quarrel between the grand vizier and the French ambassador made the position of French subjects dangerous, and Chardin escaped in a small vessel across the Black Sea, and made a most adventurous journey by Caffa, and through Georgia, and Armenia to Isfahan, which he reached in 1673. 
At Sapias, he was robbed by thugs in Samegrelo of all he possessed except two small bundles, worth £6,000. 
He stayed at Ispahan four years, following the court in all its removals, and making particular journeys throughout the land, from the Caspian to the Persian Gulf and the river Indus, and visiting several Indian cities. 
By these two journeys he realised a considerable fortune, and, deciding to return home, reached Europe in 1677 by a voyage round the Cape of Good Hope.

Of four volumes originally projected the first volume was published in 1686, Journal du Voyage . . . de Chardin en Parse et aux Indes Orientales, London, fol. 
An English translation was issued concurrently. 
This volume contains the author's journey from Paris to Ispahan, and has the author's half-length portrait by Loggan, with eighteen copper plates, mostly folding. 
His former work is reprinted there with a fulsome 'Epistle Dedicatory to James II.'

Chardin in his preface announced three other volumes to follow. The last, which was to contain a short history of Persia, along with his diaries for 1675–77, never appeared. The other three volumes (with many additions to the first) were published at Amsterdam, 1711, 4to, Voyages de Mons. le Chevalier Chardin, as the complete work. In 1711 another edition, with his translation of La Relation des Mingreliens, by J. M, Zampi, appeared in ten vols., Amsterdam, l2mo; and in 1735 another edition was published in four vols. 4to, containing a great number of passages added from his manuscripts, but with many omissions of violent Calvinistic passages. The most complete reprint is that of M. L. Langles, in ten vols. 8vo, Paris, 1811. 
Chardin's style of writing is simple and graphic, and he gives a faithful account of what he saw and heard. Montesquieu, Rousseau, Gibbon, and Helvetius acknowledge the value of his writings; and Sir William Jones says he gave the best account of Muslim nations ever published. 
Extracts from his works appear in all the chief collections of travels, but there is no complete English translation.

In 1681, Chardin determined to settle in England because of the persecution of Protestants in France. 
He was well received at court, and was soon after appointed court jeweller. 
He was knighted by Charles II at Whitehall, 17 November 1681. 
The same day he married a Protestant lady, Esther, daughter of M. de Lardinière Peigné, councillor in the Parliament of Rouen, then a refugee in London. 
He carried on a considerable trade in jewels, and in the correspondence of his time was called 'the flower of merchants.' 
In 1682, when he lived in Holland House, Kensington, he was elected a fellow of the Royal Society. 
In 1684, the king sent him as envoy to Holland, where he stayed some years, was styled agent to the East India Company. 
On his return to London he devoted most of his time to oriental studies. 
In the prefaces to his works, 1686 and 1711, besides travels he speaks of what he calls 'my favourite desipi,' or 'Notes upon Passages of to the Holy Scriptures, illustrated by Eastern ally Customs and Manners,' as having occupied his time for many years.

He did not live after to publish it, and after his death the manuscript was supposed to be lost. 
Some of his descendants advertised a reward of twenty guineas for it. 
When Thomas Harmer published a second edition of his, 'Observations on divers passages of Scripture,' 2 vols., London, 1776, 8vo, it was found that he had recovered the lost manuscript in six small volumes with the help of Sir Philip Musgrave, a descendant of Chardin, and had incorporated almost all of them in his work, under the author's name, or signed 'MS. C.,' i.e. manuscript of Chardin.

In his latter years Chardin lived at Turnin.
Sir John died in Chiswick, London in 1713. He was buried in Turnham Green (Chiswick). A funeral monument to Chardin exists in Westminster Abbey, bearing the inscription Sir John Chardin – nomen sibi fecit eundo ("he made a name for himself by travelling").

The remains of Chardin's library were sold by James Levy at Tom's coffee-house, St. Martin's Lane, 1712–13.

Family

He had four sons and three daughters.  His eldest son, John, was created a baronet 1720 and died unmarried. He had three others, Daniel, Charles and George. He left his large Kempton Manor House and estate, Sunbury on Thames to his nephew Sir Philip Chardin Musgrave.

Value of Chardin's work

Modern scholars consider the 1811 edition of Voyages (edited by the Orientalist Louis-Mathieu Langlès) to be the standard version. The complete book has never been translated into English; in fact, English-language versions contain less than half of the original material.

Early readers commended Chardin's work for its fullness and fidelity, and he received praise from a number of Enlightenment thinkers, among them Montesquieu, Rousseau, Voltaire and Gibbon. Latter-day scholars of Persia also vouch for his importance; according to John Emerson, "his information on Safavid Persia outranks that of all other Western writers in range, depth, accuracy, and judiciousness." Chardin travelled far and wide, had a good command of the Persian language, and left detailed accounts of the places and people he encountered. He also had direct access to the Safavid court, and his descriptions of contemporary politics and administration are highly regarded. Although there are occasional lapses in his books, he is generally trusted as a reliable witness, and his work has been used as a source for diverse studies on Safavid history, government, economics, anthropology, religion, art and culture.

French-language biographies of Chardin
Jean Chardin's life story forms the basis of Dirk Van der Cruysse's 1998 book Chardin le Persan, and of the partly fictionalised 2011 biography, Le Joaillier d'Ispahan by Danielle Digne.

See also
 France-Iran relations
 Franco-Persian alliance
 Chardin baronets

Further reading
 
 
 . v.1

References

Attribution

External links

John Emerson's biography of Chardin in Encyclopaedia Iranica.
Partial extracts from Dirk Van der Cruysse's Chardin le Persan, Fayard, Paris, 1998.
John Chardin Correspondence and Documents. General Collection, Beinecke Rare Book and Manuscript Library, Yale University.

1643 births
1713 deaths
Writers from Paris
Explorers from Paris
Explorers of Iran
Historians of Iran
Explorers of Georgia (country)
Historians of Georgia (country)
Huguenots
Fellows of the Royal Society
Explorers of India
French expatriates in Iran
Explorers of the Caucasus
Businesspeople from Paris
French emigrants to the Kingdom of England